Adamik or Adámik is a Slavic surname.

Notable people with the surname include:
 Jozef Adámik (born 1985), Slovak footballer
 Katarzyna Adamik (born 1972), Polish film director
 Sabine Adamik, or Sabine Bothe (born 1960), German handball player
 Zoltán Adamik (1928–1992), Hungarian Olympic sprinter

References

West Slavic-language surnames